Joseph Nichols "Hap" Ward  (November 15, 1885 – September 13, 1979) played in the outfield for the Detroit Tigers on May 18, 1912.

Biography
He was born on November 15, 1885, in the Leesburg section of Maurice River Township, New Jersey. He played in the outfield for the Detroit Tigers on May 18, 1912.

Three days earlier, Tigers' star Ty Cobb was taunted with racial slurs in New York by a fan named Claude Lueker.  Cobb lost his cool, went into the stands, and attacked the heckler.  The heckler was handicapped, having lost one complete hand and three fingers from the other hand in an industrial accident, and unable to defend himself.  When fans yelled at Cobb that the man had no hands, Cobb shouted back, "I don't care if he has no feet!"  American League president Ban Johnson responded by suspending Cobb indefinitely.

Cobb's teammates voted to strike in response to Cobb's suspension, declaring that they would not take the field again until Cobb was reinstated.  Ban Johnson refused to back down and told Tigers owner Frank Navin that the team would be fined $5,000 for every game in which they failed to field a team.

Navin ordered manager Hughie Jennings to find players willing to take the field.  The Tigers were on the road in Philadelphia, and so Jennings recruited eight "Tigers" from a neighborhood in North Philadelphia. Each man was paid $25. A 26-year-old "Hap" Ward was one of the local "sandlotters" who ended playing for the Tigers in one of the worst defeats in major league history.

"Hap" Ward played in the outfield for the replacement Tigers.  He went hitless in two at bats but played flawlessly in the outfield with two putouts and no errors.  In front of 20,000 Philadelphia fans, the Athletics set a club scoring record in trouncing the replacement Tigers by a score of 24–2.  The Tigers' starting pitcher, Allan Travers was a college student who later confessed he had never pitched a game in his life.  Travers later became a Catholic priest.

After the embarrassing display, Ban Johnson met personally with the striking Tigers and told them they would be banned for life if the strike continued.  Ty Cobb urged his teammates to end the strike, and the Tigers complied.  Accordingly, the major league career of "Hap" Ward and the other replacement Tigers was cut short at one game.

By playing in this game, Ward became a small piece of baseball history with his name and "career" statistics recorded forever in the records of Major League Baseball along with Ty Cobb and other legends of the game.

Hap Ward died at age 93 in 1979 in Elmer, New Jersey.

External links

 SABR Biography of "Replacement Tiger" Allan Travers

Detroit Tigers players
Baseball players from New Jersey
1885 births
1979 deaths
Major League Baseball outfielders
People from Maurice River Township, New Jersey
Sportspeople from Cumberland County, New Jersey